Hispa andrewesi, is a species of leaf beetle native to India, Sri Lanka, Nepal, South China, and Myanmar.

Body deep black in color. There are no apical spines on mid tibiae on ventral side and no additional spines on large spines on first antennal segment. Elytra stout.

References 

Cassidinae
Insects of Sri Lanka
Beetles described in 1897